The Sweden women's national under-18 and under-19 basketball team is the national women's basketball team that represents Sweden in international under-18 and under-19 (under age 19 and under age 18) tournaments. The team is controlled by the Svenska Basketbollförbundet.

See also
Sweden women's national basketball team
Sweden women's national under-17 basketball team

References

External links
Official website 
FIBA profile

B
Women's national under-19 basketball teams